Coldstream is a district municipality in British Columbia, Canada, located at the northern end of Kalamalka Lake in the Okanagan Valley. Incorporated on December 21, 1906, Coldstream celebrated its centennial in 2006. The municipality is directly southeast of Vernon and is considered part of Greater Vernon.  It is a member municipality of, and also the location of the head offices, of the Regional District of North Okanagan.

Coldstream Ranch
Coldstream is known for the Coldstream Ranch, established in 1863 by Captain Charles Frederick Houghton. He transferred the ranch to Forbes G. and Charles Albert Vernon, who in 1891 sold it to The 7th Earl of Aberdeen (later created, in 1916, The 1st Marquess of Aberdeen and Temair), future Governor General of Canada (1893–1898). The ranch was purchased by its current owners in 1994 and continues to be a working cattle ranch.

Government
Coldstream is governed by a seven-member council, led by Mayor Jim Garlick. The municipality is represented by member of Parliament Mel Arnold (Okanagan—Shuswap) and member of the Legislative Assembly Eric Foster (Okanagan-Vernon).

Economy
The Greater Vernon area was once based in forestry and agriculture. However, manufacturing, retail trade and services are now the primary industries. A suburban community known as Middleton Mountain is located in Coldsteam at the north end of Kalamalka Lake.

Demographics

Ethnicity

Religion 
According to the 2021 census, religious groups in Coldstream included:
Irreligion (6,245 persons or 56.8%)
Christianity (4,540 persons or 41.3%)
Sikhism (95 persons or 0.9%)
Buddhism (25 persons or 0.2%)
Judaism (20 persons or 0.2%)
Hinduism (10 persons or 0.1%)
Islam (10 persons or 0.1%)
Other (55 persons or 0.5%)

Education
Covered by School District 22 Vernon, Coldstream is home to Coldstream Elementary School, Kidston Elementary School and Kalamalka Secondary School. The municipality is served by the Vernon campus of Okanagan College.

Climate
Coldstream has a dry – almost semi-arid climate – with hot sunny summers and cool cloudy winters.

Weather facts:
 Driest year (1952) = 
 Wettest year (1996) = 
 Warmest year (1987) = 
 Coldest year (1916) =

Recreation

Coldstream is home to Kal Beach, which is located on the shore of Kalamalka Lake. Smaller beaches in the area include Kirkland Beach, Juniper Beach, Tamarack Beach, Long Lake Beach, Jade Bay Beach, Cosens Beach, Pebble Beach, and Cliff Beach. Coldstream borders on Kalamalka Provincial Park, which features numerous groomed hiking trails, scenic views, and natural areas. Wildlife in the park includes black bear, whitetailed deer, rattlesnake, marmot, and other creatures.

Notes

References

 
Vernon Museum – Coldstream: Nulli Secondus

External links

District municipalities in British Columbia
Populated places in the Regional District of North Okanagan
Populated places in the Okanagan Country